The 1865 New Jersey gubernatorial election was held on November 7, 1865. Republican nominee Marcus Lawrence Ward defeated Democratic nominee Theodore Runyon with 51.07% of the vote.

Republicans would not win another New Jersey election until 1895.

General election

Candidates
Marcus Lawrence Ward, National Union nominee for Governor in 1862 (Republican)
Theodore Runyon, Mayor of Newark (Democratic)

Results

References

1865
New Jersey
1865 New Jersey elections
November 1865 events